Anton Marek (9 February 1913 – 6 February 1963) was an Austrian football player and manager who played as a defender for Nord-Wien, Wacker Vienna, Club Français, RC Lens and Toulouse FC.

After retiring Marek managed RC Lens, OGC Nice, AS Cannes, Draguignan and Monaco.

References

External links
 Player profile at Sitercl.com 
 

1913 births
1963 deaths
Footballers from Vienna
Association football defenders
Austrian footballers
Austrian expatriate footballers
Expatriate footballers in France
RC Lens players
Ligue 1 players
Ligue 2 players
Austrian football managers
RC Lens managers
OGC Nice managers
AS Cannes managers
AS Monaco FC managers
Club Français players
Expatriate football managers in Monaco
Austrian expatriate sportspeople in Monaco